Moisés Fermín Villarroel Ayala (born 12 February 1976) is a Chilean football manager and former player who played as a midfielder.

Career
He played for Colo-Colo, where he was part of the 2006 apertura, 2006 clausura, 2007 apertura, 2007 clausura, 2008 clausura championship teams.
Now he is the captain of Santiago Wanderers club where he started his football career.

Villarroel's international debut came in a match against Venezuela, which Chile won 6–0 on April 29, 1997.  He has capped 34 times and scored 1 goal for the Chile national team between 1997 and 2005, including four games at the 1998 FIFA World Cup.  He has also represented his country in four Copa América tournaments.

Villaroel has mainly played as a right sided defender and defensive midfielder.  He has been described as a tough defensive minded player with a high work-rate.

Coaching career

Santiago Wanderers
Short after retiring in 2014, Villarroel started coaching the youth teams at Santiago Wanderers. On 21 March 2018, Villarroel was appointed as the new manager of Santiago Wanderers.  Until December 2021, he was the manager of Santiago Wanderers' youth setup.

Personal life
He is the father of the professional footballer Martín Villarroel who is a product of the Santiago Wanderers youth system.

Honours

Club
Santiago Wanderers
 Segunda División de Chile (1): 1995
 Primera División de Chile (1): 2001

Colo-Colo
 Primera División de Chile (5): 2006-A, 2006-C, 2007-A, 2007-C, 2008-C

References

External links
 

1976 births
Living people
People from Viña del Mar
Chilean footballers
Chile international footballers
Association football midfielders
Santiago Wanderers footballers
Colo-Colo footballers
Chilean Primera División players
Primera B de Chile players
1997 Copa América players
1998 FIFA World Cup players
1999 Copa América players
2001 Copa América players
2004 Copa América players
Chilean football managers
Santiago Wanderers managers
Primera B de Chile managers